Megachile arnaui is a species of bee in the family Megachilidae. It was described by Moure in 1948.

References

Arnaui
Insects described in 1948